Apheloria tigana, Yellow-and-black Flat Millipede, is a large North American flat-backed millipede in the family Xystodesmidae. It is reported to secrete cyanide compounds as a defense.  It is recommended that one wash hands after handling this organism as the toxic compounds it secretes are poisonous and can cause extreme irritation if rubbed in the eyes.

Characteristics include yellow paranota (lateral segmental expansions on the dorsa), a yellow mid-dorsal spot on the anterior margin of the collum or 1st segment, and yellow mid-dorsal spots on the caudal-most 3-5 segments. South of the Cape Fear River basin there is an undescribed Apheloria species with yellow middorsal marks on most segments.

A. tigana occurs in the Eastern United States, from southeastern North Carolina northward throughout the Blue Ridge Mountains.

References

External links

Apheloria tigana  - BugGuide
Millipedes (Diplopoda)

Polydesmida
Millipedes of North America
Animals described in 1939